Jolly Roger: Massacre at Cutter's Cove is a 2005 American horror film by The Asylum, written by Gary Jones and Jeffrey Miller and directed by Jones, and starring Rhett Giles as Jolly Roger.

Plot 

The evil pirate Roger LaForge, better known as Jolly Roger, comes back from the dead to kill the descendants of his crew who mutinied against him 300 years earlier.

Cast 

 Rhett Giles as Roger "Jolly Roger" LaForge
 Tom Nagel as Alex Weatherly
 Kristina Korn as Jessie Hendrickson
 Thomas Downey as Chief Mathis
 Kim Little as Detective Lowenstein
 Pamela Munro as Mayor Judith Bates
 Dean N. Arevalo as Deputy Tanner
 Sergio Samayoa as Deputy Yee
 Justin Brannock as Tom Torrington
 Megan Lee Ethridge as Sasha
 Hajar Northern as Eve
 Ted Cochran as Phillip
 Conrad Angel Corral as Mr. Sims
 Spencer Jones as Abernathy
 Amanda Barton as Agnes
 Griff Furst as William Barrows
 Kellie McKuen as Zelda
 Leigh Scott as Ray
 Berna Roberts as Carla
 Carrie Booska as Melinda "Bambi" Cornwell
 Ty Nickelberry as Danny Ray, The Bouncer
 Coleman McClary as Hancock

Release
The film was released on DVD by Mosaic on November 28, 2005. In 2007, it released by Terra and Timeless Media on April 3, and June 5 respectively.

Reception

Critical reception for the film has been negative.

Dread Central gave the film a score of 2 1/2 out of 5 the reviewer stating, "While I enjoyed the slashing antics of Jolly Roger, as slight as they may have been at times, that ending did not leave me wanting more".
Michael Helms from Digital Retribution.com gave the film a positive review, awarding the film a score of 4 / 5 stating, "Although there might have been a little more work performed on Jolly Roger himself to make him much stronger in the Wishmaster sense of second tier horror franchise characters, the bottom line is this film delivers the gory goods".
Rick Blalock from Terror Hook.com gave the film a mixed score of 5.5/10, complimenting the film's gore and sharp editing bur criticized the film's "cheesy" plot and slow start. Andrew Smith of Popcorn Pictures awarded the film a score of 4/10, writing, "Jolly Roger: Massacre at Cutter’s Cove is harmless enough fun but it could have been a much greater throwback to the 80s slasher film had the script been tighter and the character of Roger been taken more seriously."

Not all reviews of the film were negative.
Film Threat gave the film a positive review, writing, " While just as dumb as Death Valley: the Legend of Bloody Bill, Jolly Roger is way more fun. And with a decapitation nearly every two minutes, director Jones certainly knows how to keep the red flowing."

References

External links 
 
 
 

2005 films
2005 horror films
2005 independent films
Pirate films
American slasher films
The Asylum films
American supernatural horror films
Films directed by Gary Jones
American ghost films
American films about revenge
Films about Satanism
American exploitation films
American splatter films
2000s English-language films
2000s American films